Notts, Lincs & Derbyshire/Leicestershire 1 East was a tier 9 division in the English rugby union system with teams from Nottinghamshire, Lincolnshire and the eastern region of Leicestershire taking part. Promoted teams moved up to Midlands 4 East (North) and relegated teams dropped to Notts, Lincs & Derbyshire/Leicestershire 2 East.

The division was created in 2000, along with its counterpart Notts, Lincs & Derbyshire/Leicestershire 1 West, following the splitting of the East Midlands and Leicestershire leagues and the subsequent merging of the Leicestershire and Notts, Lincs & Derbyshire leagues. After four seasons the league was discontinued following further restructuring and the majority of teams moved into the newly created Notts, Lincs, Derbyshire/North Leicestershire and Nottinghamshire/Lincolnshire divisions.

Original teams

When this division was introduced in 2000 it contained the following teams:

Barton & District – transferred from Notts, Lincs & Derbyshire 1 (14th) 
Boots Athletic – transferred from Notts, Lincs & Derbyshire 1 (12th)
Boston – promoted from Notts, Lincs & Derbyshire 2 (runners-up)
Cleethorpes – promoted from Notts, Lincs & Derbyshire 2 (5th)
Cotgrave – promoted from Notts, Lincs & Derbyshire 2 (3rd)
East Retford – promoted from Notts, Lincs & Derbyshire 2 (champions)
Keyworth – transferred from Notts, Lincs & Derbyshire 1 (7th)
Nottinghamians – transferred from Notts, Lincs & Derbyshire 1 (8th)
Oakham – transferred from East Midlands 1 (4th)
Southwell – transferred from Notts, Lincs & Derbyshire 1 (13th)

Notts, Lincs & Derbyshire/Leicestershire 1 East honours

Promotion play-offs

After the 2003–04 season, there was a promotion play-off between the runners-up of Notts, Lincs & Derbyshire/Leicestershire 1 East and Notts, Lincs & Derbyshire/Leicestershire 1 West for the third place to Midlands 4 East (North). The team with the superior league record had home advantage in the tie.

Number of league titles

Oakham (2)
East Retford (1)
Mellish (1)

Notes

See also
Notts, Lincs & Derbyshire/Leicestershire 1 West
Notts, Lincs & Derbyshire/Leicestershire 2 East
Notts, Lincs & Derbyshire/Leicestershire 2 West
Midlands RFU
Notts, Lincs & Derbyshire RFU
Leicestershire RU
English rugby union system
Rugby union in England

References

External links
 NLD RFU website
 Leicestershire Rugby Union website

9
Rugby union in Nottinghamshire
Rugby union in Lincolnshire
Rugby union in Leicestershire
Sports leagues established in 2000
Sports leagues disestablished in 2004